Coopers Beach is a settlement on the southern side of Doubtless Bay in Northland, New Zealand.  runs through it. It is one of the Taipa-Mangonui string of settlements, separated from Cable Bay on the west by Otanenui Stream and from Mangōnui on the east by Mill Bay Road.

The settlement is named for coopers who build and repair barrels.

Taumarumaru Reserve on the western side of Coopers Beach contains three pā sites. Taumarumaru Pā is on the central ridge, with Ohumuhumu Pā and Otanenui Pā on the headland.

Rangikapiti Pā is a heritage site northeast of Coopers Beach which retains terraces and a defensive ditch around the pā.

Demographics
Statistics New Zealand describes Coopers Beach as a rural settlement. Coopers Beach is part of the larger Taumarumaru statistical area.

Coopers Beach had a population of 570 at the 2018 New Zealand census, an increase of 105 people (22.6%) since the 2013 census, and an increase of 138 people (31.9%) since the 2006 census. There were 231 households, comprising 273 males and 297 females, giving a sex ratio of 0.92 males per female, with 105 people (18.4%) aged under 15 years, 51 (8.9%) aged 15 to 29, 207 (36.3%) aged 30 to 64, and 210 (36.8%) aged 65 or older.

Ethnicities were 75.3% European/Pākehā, 31.6% Māori, 6.3% Pacific peoples, 2.6% Asian, and 2.1% other ethnicities. People may identify with more than one ethnicity.

Of those people who chose to answer the census's question about religious affiliation, 43.7% had no religion, 42.6% were Christian, 1.6% had Māori religious beliefs, 1.1% were Hindu, 0.5% were Buddhist and 2.6% had other religions.

Of those at least 15 years old, 87 (18.7%) people had a bachelor or higher degree, and 105 (22.6%) people had no formal qualifications. 39 people (8.4%) earned over $70,000 compared to 17.2% nationally. The employment status of those at least 15 was that 120 (25.8%) people were employed full-time, 63 (13.5%) were part-time, and 18 (3.9%) were unemployed.

Notes

Far North District
Populated places in the Northland Region